JAGGAER, formerly SciQuest, is a provider of cloud-based business automation technology for Business Spend Management. Its headquarters is in Morrisville, North Carolina and it has offices around the world. The company's tagline is Procurement Simplified.

Company history
SciQuest was established in 1995 as a B2B eCommerce exchange.The company went public with an IPO in 1999. In 2001, SciQuest transitioned from a B2B exchange company into eProcurement software and supplier enablement platforms. SciQuest was taken private in 2004 and continued to move into eProcurement, inventory management and accounts payable automation. SciQuest completed an IPO in September 2010 raising approximately $57 million. SciQuest was taken private in June 2016 as part of an acquisition by Accel-KKR, a private equity firm headquartered in Menlo Park, CA. 

In 2017 SciQuest was rebranded as JAGGAER and announced increased focus on offering a complete, integrated source-to-pay suite. Along with the name change, the company expanded its market focus to manufacturing, healthcare, consumer packaged goods, retail, education, life sciences, logistics and the public sector.

JAGGAER acquired the European direct materials procurement specialist Pool4Tool in June 2017 giving it end-to-end direct as well as indirect materials procurement coverage.

JAGGAER acquired spend management company BravoSolution in 2017, and entered into a joint venture with United Arab Emirates-based Tejari. Gartner, Inc. named JAGGAER (Advantage) highest for Ability to Execute in its 2018 “Magic Quadrant for Strategic Sourcing Application Suites.” JAGGAER was named as a Leader in Gartner, Inc's 2018 “Magic Quadrant for Procure-to-Pay Suites” in early 2018 and again in 2019.

In February 2019 JAGGAER launched JAGGAER ONE, which unifies its full product suite on a single platform.

In 2019 the UK-based private equity firm Cinven acquired a majority holding in the company. Jim Bureau was subsequently named JAGGAER's Chief Executive Officer. Bureau joined JAGGAER in 2018 and had been responsible for the company's sales and commercial operations.

Product Categories
The JAGGAER ONE platform supports the following products:
 Spend Analytics
 Category Management
 Supplier Management
 Sourcing
 Contracts
 eProcurement
 Invoicing
 Inventory Management
 Supply Chain Collaboration
 Quality Management

Acquisitions
SciQuest acquired the following companies:
 AECsoft - January 2011. Provider of supplier management and sourcing technology.
 Upside Software, Inc. - August 2012. Provider of contract lifecycle management (CLM) solutions.
 Spend Radar, LLC - October 2012, Provider of spend analysis software.
 CombineNet - September 2013, Provider of advanced sourcing software

JAGGAER acquired the following companies:
 POOL4TOOL - June 2017, Provider of direct sourcing and supply chain management software
 BravoSolution - December 2017, Provider of global platform spend management solutions

References

Application software
Research Triangle
Software companies based in North Carolina
1995 establishments in North Carolina
Software companies established in 1995
Software companies of the United States
Companies formerly listed on the Nasdaq
2010 initial public offerings
2016 mergers and acquisitions